The Special Relationship is the unofficial term for relations between the United Kingdom and the United States.

Special Relationship also may refer to:

 Special relationship (international relations), other exceptionally strong ties between nations
 The Special Relationship (film), a 2010 British-American political film
 "The Special Relationship" (The Green Green Grass), an episode of the BBC comedic series
 A Special Relationship, novel by Douglas Kennedy

See also
 United Kingdom–United States relations